Pultenaea luehmannii, commonly known as thready bush-pea, is a species of flowering plant in the family Fabaceae and is endemic to the Grampians National Park. It is a diffuse, more or less prostrate sub-shrub with trailing branches, narrow elliptic leaves, and orange and dark brown flowers.

Description
Pultenaea luehmannii is a diffuse, more or less prostrate sub-shrub with slender, glabrous, trailing branches. The flowers are arranged in groups of three to six. Flowering occurs from October to November and the fruit is an egg-shaped, sparsely hairy pod.

Taxonomy and naming
Pultenaea luehmannii was first formally described in 1905 by Joseph Maiden in The Victorian Naturalist from specimens collected in 1904 in the Grampians National Park by Herbert Williamson. The specific epithet (luehmannii) honours Johann George Luehmann.

Distribution and habitat
Thready push-pea grows in wet heath and on the edges of swamps and streams in the Grampians National Park in south-western Victoria.

References

luehmannii
Flora of Victoria (Australia)
Plants described in 1905
Taxa named by Joseph Maiden